Johann Nepomuk Schelble (16 May 1789 – 6 August 1837), was a German conductor, composer, singer (tenor) and music teacher. Best known as the founding conductor of Cäcilienverein (the Choir of Saint Cecilia, known today as the Cäcilienchor Frankfurt), he also helped revive interest in the work of Johann Sebastian Bach.

The second of 14 children and the only son of Franz (or Franciscus) Joseph (Donat) Schelble (17 February 1762 – 13 february 1835) and Katharina Schelble née Götz (1 November 1760 – 4 April 1847), Johann Nepomuk Schelble was born in Hüfingen, a small town in the Black Forest in what is now the Schwarzwald-Baar District in the south of Baden-Württemberg, Germany. Several variations of the family name appear in historical records: Schälble, Schälblin, Schelblin and Schelble. Schälblin (probably pronounced “SHAY-blin”) might have been the original name, which gradually transformed into Schelble with the change of ending in the Swabian dialect. The Schelble name was already frequent in the 17th and 18th Centuries in the Baar region; the name is found not only in Hüfingen, but in Villingen-Schwenningen and Donaueschingen as well. The earliest surviving reference to the Schelble family name is the birth of Samuel Schelble (or Schelblin) in Hüfingen in 1590. Samuel had at least one wife: Anna; one son: Johann Jakob Samuel; one daughter: Anna Maria; and one sister: Elisabeth Boehler née Schelblin. The Schelble family name appears in its various spellings continuously from Samuel Schelble's birth up to the present day. The Schelbles in Hüfingen were frequently bureaucrats or civil servants; but music seems to have always had a place in the family. The only son of 14 children, Johann Nepomuk Schelble is without a doubt the best known member of the Schelble family. His mother, Katharina Götz, the daughter of a wealthy farmer, was both musically inclined and possessed a beautiful singing voice, which was to show itself most clearly in her son's successful singing career. It is reported that the grandfather of Johann Nepomuk Schelble, Franz Xaver Schelble, also enjoyed performing music. Both the grandfather and father of Johann Nepomuk dedicated themselves to the craft of barrel painting in addition to their clerical service with the Judiciary for the Principality of Fürstenberg; both also participated in the church as violinists. Franz Josef Schelble (1762-1835 ), the father of Johann Nepomuk, turned from barrel painting to school service; he received instruction in Donaueschingen in both organ and piano playing. Ultimately however, his lack of a singing voice convinced him to give up his aspirations as a musician, although he did continue to occupy himself for some time with the art of instrument making (constructing pianos of simple design), a hobby which he continued to practice, and which earned him the title of “piano-maker.” His first secure position came in 1790, when he became a breeder, but by 1806 he was employed as a warden or corrections house supervisor. Although the Schelble family line has since died out in Hüfingen, members of the Nober and Reich branches of the family were still living in the town prior to the Second World War. Johann Nepomuk Schelble was born on 16 May 1789 in Hüfingen. His mother sang the first songs Johann was to hear, and he was to receive his initial instruction on the piano from his father. Even as a young child, he demonstrated a particular gift for music, and so it was only a question of time before the boy’s talent developed and - despite the interruption of frequent wars – found its expression. On an Austrian piano-playing field trip, the 7 year old boy became acquainted with the melodies of Mozart. The vicar Eiselin was to become his first, official teacher in singing. Fearing the discouragement of his other pupils due to the great advances Nepomuk was making, the curate dismissed him from his studies with the explanation that he “lacked talent.” The young Schelble finally got a break as a choir boy in 1800 in the royal diocese of Obermarchtal, at the time an important Swabian monastery. Although the instruction he was to receive there was similarly pedantic and bore little in the way of real results, Schelble was nevertheless to receive his first deep impressions of what Music could be: the nightly psalms of the monks accompanied by the organ playing of the famous “Contrapuntal” Sixt Bachmann remained indelibly etched in his memory. For the next two decades, his ever more successful career as a court and opera singer took the tenor first to Stuttgart, then to Vienna and Berlin, where he was to meet with critical success. His career finally took him to Frankfurt, where in June of 1816 Schelble entered into contract negotiations with the National Theater in Frankfurt. As we learn from a letter of Schelble’s to the singer Graff in Frankfurt, Schelble had definitely decided to leave the Imperial States; he gave preference, therefore, to Frankfurt over Vienna, where he could have found favorable employment with the theater “An der Wien.” The negotiations with Frankfurt had probably drawn on too long or had been broken off: Schelble left the royal city in August 1816, rejecting the opportunity to go to Prague in favor of Berlin, where he had managed to secure several guest roles. There is no doubt that in Berlin, Schelble became even better known with Zelter and the Sing-Akademie zu Berlin, what was to be the model for the Caecilienverein he established a few years later, when he would finally move to Frankfurt. In 1820, Johann Nepomuk Schelble began what would prove to be a loving but childless marriage with Molli Müller, a young woman from Königsberg. Throughout his life, Schelble maintained close ties to his Hüfingen relatives, even acquiring a "small country estate" (Landgütchen) in 1824 or 1825, which he affectionately referred to as his "Tranquil Valley" (Ruhetal). At the age of 48, Schelble died in his wife's arms at the entrance to his house on Bräunlinger Straße in Hüfingen. In 1842, Schelble's widow married Georg Konrad, a man from Sankt Georgen im Schwarzwald, a town in Southwestern Baden-Württemberg, Germany found in the Schwarzwald-Baar-Kreis District. Of particular note for musical history is Schelble’s friendship with Jakob Ludwig Felix Mendelssohn Bartholdy, because of his influence on the development of the Bach Renaissance. The first meeting of the two artists occurred in the year 1822; at that time the 13 year-old Mendelssohn stayed with the Schelbles in Frankfurt upon returning from a trip to Switzerland and found a loving and paternal friend in Schelble. Mendelssohn visited Schelble often in Frankfurt and stayed with him. In the year 1836 he took over conducting the choir for a brief period of time while Schelble was ill and staying in Hüfingen. A letter from the time reveals his admiration and love for Mendelssohn, whose genius Schelble recognized and helped to awaken.

Schelble was born in Hüfingen, in the Black Forest.  At the age of 18 he obtained a position as court and opera singer in Stuttgart, and having there begun the study of composition, he wrote an opera (Graf Adalbert) and other smaller pieces for voices or instruments; there too he was appointed teacher at the musical school of the city. Seven years later (1814), in order to perfect himself in his art, he went to Vienna, where he made the acquaintance of Beethoven. Among other of his compositions during his stay is a Missa solemnis for four voices and orchestra. Upon his arrival in Berlin in 1818, Clemens Brentano, with whom he had formed a friendship, procured him a place as first tenor in Frankfurt.

In this city he remained for the rest of his life, and there founded the Society of St. Cecilia, which worked to popularise classical music. He began by giving a weekly musical entertainment in his own house; these meetings were popular, and before long he was able to give them a permanent form under the title Cäcilienverein. Its members steadily increased in numbers: in 1818 he began with 21 members; in a few years there were a hundred. The first concert given was the Magic Flute of Mozart; soon followed works by Händel, Mozart, Haydn and Beethoven, and after 1828 those of Bach, and earlier composers such as Palestrina, Pergolesi, etc. In 1836 his health became impaired, and he returned to his native country to recuperate; but in vain. The following year he died. During his absence Felix Mendelssohn took his place as director of the society. Such was Mendelssohn's affection for him, that at the death of his (Mendelssohn's) father, he reportedly wrote to Schelble: "You are the only friend who after such a loss can fill the place of my father".

In 1831 Schelble commissioned Mendelssohn to write an Oratorio on behalf of the Society of St Cecilia. Mendelssohn chose as his subject St. Paul (oratorio).

References

1789 births
1837 deaths
German composers
Pupils of Georg Joseph Vogler
19th-century German musicians